Otto Aron Salomon (1849–1907) was a Swedish educator and both a noted writer and proponent of educational sloyd. Born in Gothenburg, Sweden in 1849, Salomon studied at the Institute of Technology in Stockholm but left after a year to accept a position as Director of the Sloyd Teachers Seminary in Nääs, Sweden. It was while at the seminary that Salomon was able to popularize the educational sloyd movement.

Bibliography
The Slöjd in the Service of the School (1888)

External links
Otto Salomon at the International Bureau of Education
Otto Salomon (1849-1907)

1849 births
1907 deaths
Swedish educators
Swedish male writers
People from Gothenburg
Swedish Jews
Sloyd